Paris Township is one of fifteen townships in Edgar County, Illinois, USA.  As of the 2010 census, its population was 9,865 and it contained 4,763 housing units.

Geography

Cities, towns, villages
 Paris (vast majority)

Extinct towns
 Harris

Cemeteries
The township contains these five cemeteries: Conkey, Edgar, Paris Memorial Gardens, Redmon and Saint Marys.

Major highways
  US Route 150
  Illinois Route 1
  Illinois Route 16
  Illinois Route 133

Airports and landing strips
 Paris Community Hospital Heliport
 Stewart Airport

Demographics

Education
Paris Township contains six schools: 
Carolyn Wenz Elementary School 
Crestwood School 
Mayo Middle School 
Memorial Elementary School, 
Paris Cooperative High School

Public School districts
 Paris Community Unit School District 4  Paris Crestwood Unit 4 
 Paris-Union School District 95   Paris District 95

Political districts
 Illinois's 15th congressional district
 State House District 109
 State Senate District 55

References
 
 United States Census Bureau 2007 TIGER/Line Shapefiles
 United States National Atlas

External links
 City-Data.com
 Illinois State Archives
 Edgar County Official Site

Townships in Edgar County, Illinois
Townships in Illinois